Muhammad Idrees Dahri is an Islamic scholar, preacher, writer, author, poet and researcher of Sindh, Pakistan. He is Hanafi, Maturidi, and belongs to the Naqshbandi Mujaddidi Sufi order. He is a khalifa (deputy) of Allah Bakhsh Abbasi Naqshbandi. He also has teaching permissions in Shadhili and Alawi Sufi orders.

Tariqat
He entered the Naqshbandi tariqah by taking oath of allegiance with Allah Bakhsh Abbasi Naqshbandi of Sindh, and received Khilafat (Ijazah) on 18 Rabi-us-Sani 1405AH. In the Alawi Sufi order, he received Ijazah from Zain ibn Ibrahim Sameet al-Alawi of Makkah, SA, and in the Shadhili Sufi order, he has Ijazah from Fahmi of Madinah, SA.

Books

Books 
 Tafsir of the Holy Quran (Sindhi) in 8 volumes
 Faza'il-e-Miswak
 Iden Ja Fazail Aen Masail
 Juma Ja Fazail Aen Masail
 Karamat Imam Rabbani, contains miracles of Imam Rabbani
 Ad-Dolat al-Kubra, Sharah Asma-ul-Husna
 Thubut Khatm-e-Nabuwwat

Translations 
 Baqiat al-Salihat, translated from Arabic into Sindhi, author: Allama Makhdoom Muhammad Hashim Thattvi, biographies of Muhammad's wives.
 Khamsat al-Tahirah, translated from Arabic into Sindhi, author: Allama Makhdoom Muhammad Hashim Thattvi, about the proofs in Sharia regarding the concept of Panjtan Pak (Five Blessed)
 Madah Nama Sindh, translated from Arabic into Sindhi, author: Allama Makhdoom Muhammad Hashim Thattvi, Praise of Sindh in Islamic history

References

External links 
 Online books of Muhammad Idrees Dahiri

Living people
Pakistani Sunni Muslim scholars of Islam
Sunni Muslim scholars of Islam
Pakistani translators
Translators of the Quran into Sindhi
Pakistani Sufis
Pakistani writers
Sufi poets
Naqshbandi order
Sufi teachers
1947 births